Gabriel Mar Gregorios (born 10 February 1948) is Metropolitan of the Diocese of Thiruvananthapuram of the Indian (Malankara) Orthodox Church.

References

1948 births
Living people
Malankara Orthodox Syrian Church bishops
20th-century Oriental Orthodox clergy
21st-century Oriental Orthodox bishops